Mørkved is a surname. Notable people with the surname include:

Albert Andreas Mørkved (1898–1990), Norwegian lawyer, judge and politician
Ann Iren Mørkved (born 1981), Norwegian footballer
Knut Mørkved (1938–2017), Norwegian diplomat
Lorents Mørkved (1844–1924), Norwegian politician
Salamon Mørkved (1891–1978), Norwegian politician